The Rote Revue was an organ of the Social Democratic Party of Switzerland and existed between 1921 and 2009.

History and profile
Rote Revue was founded by Robert Grimm and Ernst Nobs in 1921. Nobs was its first editor.

From 1921 to 1966, the magazine appeared under the title Rote Revue: sozialistische Monatsschrift (″socialist monthly revue″). From 1967 to 1980 it appeared under the title Profile: sozialdemokratische Zeitschrift für Politik, Wirtschaft und Kultur. From 1980 to 1989 it appeared under the title Rote Revue - Profil: Monatszeitschrift. From 1989 to 2009, it appeared under the title Rote Revue: Zeitschrift für Politik, Wirtschaft und Kultur.

Rote Revue went defunct in 2009. All editions have been made available online by the Swiss Electronic Academic Library Service (SEALS) in 2014.

Notes

1921 establishments in Switzerland
2009 disestablishments in Switzerland
Defunct magazines published in Switzerland
Defunct political magazines
German-language magazines
Magazines established in 1921
Magazines disestablished in 2009
Magazines published in Zürich
Social Democratic Party of Switzerland
Political magazines published in Switzerland